Baba Salia Affoloh Ouattara (born 24 April 1990) is an Ivorian football attacker playing for Ashanti Gold S.C.

Club career
He played many years with AS Denguélé in the Ivory Coast Ligue 1. He moved abroad in 2013 and joined Royal Thai Navy F.C. playing in the Thai Division 1 League, Thailand's second level. In January 2015 he signed with Serbian side FK Mladost Lučani but made no appearance in the 2014–15 Serbian SuperLiga. In the following summer he returned to Asia this time by signing with Vietnamese side Sông Lam Nghệ An F.C. playing in the V.League 1.

In 2018 he joined Ghanaian Premier League side Ashanti Gold S.C.

References

1990 births
Living people
Ivorian footballers
Association football forwards
AS Denguélé players
Africa Sports d'Abidjan players
Salia Ouattara
Salia Ouattara
FK Mladost Lučani players
Song Lam Nghe An FC players
V.League 1 players
FC San-Pédro players
Ashanti Gold SC players
Ivorian expatriate footballers
Expatriate footballers in Thailand
Expatriate footballers in Serbia
Expatriate footballers in Vietnam
Expatriate footballers in Ghana
Ivorian expatriate sportspeople in Thailand
Ivorian expatriate sportspeople in Serbia
Ivorian expatriate sportspeople in Vietnam
Ivorian expatriate sportspeople in Ghana